K. V. Thikkurissi (born V. V. Krishna Varman Nair; 1932 – 5 May 2021) was a Malayalam author who wrote books in different genres including poetry, children's fiction, biography and travelogues.

Biography
Born in Thikkurissi in Marthandam, he started his literary career in Thiruvananthapuram following the separation of Kanyakumari from Thiruvananthapuram. He won an award from the Kendra Sahitya Akademi for his poem Bhakranangal in 1960. His other noted works include biographies of R. Narayana Panickar and Chattambi Swamikal and children's stories about Vikramaditya. He was a member of the Kerala Sahitya Akademi, Kerala Sangeetha Nataka Akademi and Kalamandalam. He also worked as a high school teacher in different schools in Thiruvananthapuram. He died on 5 May 2021 from COVID-19.

References

1932 births
Poets from Kerala
Malayalam poets
Writers from Kerala
Indian educators
2021 deaths
People from Kanyakumari district
Deaths from the COVID-19 pandemic in India